Christian Fromm (born 15 August 1990) is a German professional volleyball player. He is a member of the Germany national team, and a bronze medallist at the 2014 World Championship. At the professional club level, he plays for Foinikas Syros.

Personal life
On 24 June 2017, Fromm married Maren Brinker.

Honours

Clubs
 National championships
 2009/2010  German Championship, with VfB Friedrichshafen
 2010/2011  German Championship, with VfB Friedrichshafen 
 2020/2021  [[Greek Championship, with Olympiacos Piraeus

Individually
2021 Greek Championship – Best Outside Hitter 
2021 Greek Championship – Best Server
2021 Greek Championship – Best Receiver

External links

 
 Player profile at LegaVolley.it 
 Player profile at PlusLiga.pl 
 Player profile at Volleybox.net 

1990 births
Living people
Volleyball players from Berlin
German men's volleyball players
European Games medalists in volleyball
European Games gold medalists for Germany
Volleyball players at the 2015 European Games
German expatriate sportspeople in Italy
Expatriate volleyball players in Italy
German expatriate sportspeople in Turkey
Expatriate volleyball players in Turkey
German expatriate sportspeople in Poland
Expatriate volleyball players in Poland
German expatriate sportspeople in Greece
Expatriate volleyball players in Greece
German expatriate sportspeople in France
Expatriate volleyball players in France
German expatriate sportspeople in Qatar
Expatriate volleyball players in Qatar
Olympiacos S.C. players
Jastrzębski Węgiel players
Outside hitters